The 2020 BoyleSports Grand Slam of Darts was the fourteenth staging of the Grand Slam of Darts, organised by the Professional Darts Corporation. The event took place, behind closed doors, from 16 to 24 November 2020 at the Ricoh Arena, Coventry.

The tournament's two-time defending champion was Gerwyn Price, who successfully defended his 2018 title by defeating Peter Wright 16–6 in 2019. Price's title defence came to an end when, after surviving a match dart from Ryan Joyce to progress through the group stage, he eventually lost 10–8 to Nathan Aspinall in the last 16.

José de Sousa became the first Portuguese darts player to win a televised title by beating James Wade 16–12 in the final; de Sousa also became the first debutant since the tournament's inception to win the title, as well as the first to win the title, without finishing top in the group phase.

Dimitri Van den Bergh broke the record for the highest individual average for this tournament when he beat Ricky Evans 5–1 in the group stage, averaging 114.85, beating Phil Taylor's previous record of 114.65 set in the 2014 tournament. Additionally, Simon Whitlock broke Adrian Lewis' record of hitting the most 180s in a Grand Slam match by scoring 20 maximums in his quarter-final victory over Michael van Gerwen.

Prize money
The prize fund for the Grand Slam was the same as 2019, with the winner getting £125,000.

Qualifying
The qualification criteria were changed from 2019, with the number of entrants from the British Darts Organisation being reduced from eight to two, with a corresponding increase in PDC players. The winner of the 2020 PDC Home Tour was invited, as were the top players from the PDC's Summer, Autumn and Winter Series events and the winner of the new women's qualifier. The Champions League of Darts was not held in 2020 due to the COVID-19 pandemic.

The qualifiers are:

PDC Qualifying Tournaments

At most twenty-two players could have qualified through this method, where the position in the list depicts the priority of the qualification.

Since the list of qualifiers from the main tournaments produced fewer than twenty-two players, the field of twenty-two players was filled from the reserve lists. The first list consisted of the winners from 2020 European Tour events, in which the winners were ordered by Order of Merit position order at the cut-off date.

Since there were still less than twenty-two qualified players after the winners of European Tour events were added, the winners of 2020 Players Championships events were added, in Order of Merit order.

PDC Qualifying Event
A further eight places in the Grand Slam of Darts were filled by qualifiers from a PDC qualifier on 9 November. These are the qualifiers:
 Ricky Evans
 Adam Hunt
 Krzysztof Ratajski
 Ryan Joyce
 Dave Chisnall
 Simon Whitlock
 Justin Pipe
 Gabriel Clemens

BDO Invitees
The two BDO world champions were invited.

Pools

Draw

Group stage
All group matches are best of nine legs  After three games, the top two in each group qualify for the knock-out stage

NB: P = Played; W = Won; L = Lost; LF = Legs for; LA = Legs against; +/− = Plus/minus record, in relation to legs; Pts = Points; Status = Qualified to knockout stage

Group A

16 November

17 November

19 November

Group B

16 November

17 November

18 November

Group C

16 November

17 November

19 November

Group D

16 November

17 November

18 November

Group E

16 November

17 November

19 November

Group F

16 November

17 November

18 November

Group G

16 November

17 November

19 November

Group H

16 November

17 November

18 November

Knockout stage

References

2020
Grand Slam
Grand Slam of Darts
Grand Slam of Darts